Steirastoma marmorata is a species of beetle in the family Cerambycidae. It was described by Carl Peter Thunberg in 1822.

References

Acanthoderini
Beetles described in 1822